The West Branch Narraguagus River is a river in Maine.

See also
 List of rivers of Maine

References

Maine Streamflow Data from the USGS
Maine Watershed Data From Environmental Protection Agency

Rivers of Hancock County, Maine
Rivers of Washington County, Maine
Rivers of Maine